The State Provincial Office on the Åland Islands represented the Finnish central government on Åland between 1918 and 2009. Due to its autonomy, it had somewhat different functions than similar offices in other Provinces of Finland.  Generally a State Provincial Office was a joint regional authority of seven different ministries of the Government of Finland. In Åland the State Provincial Office also represented a set of other authorities of the central government, which in mainland-Finland has separate bureaucracies. On the other hand duties, which on mainland-Finland were handled by the provincial offices, were transferred to the autonomous government of Åland. 

Along with the abolition of all Provinces of Finland, the Åland State Provincial Office was replaced by the State Department of Åland in 2009.

List of governors
William Isaksson (1918-1922)
Wilhelm Fagerlund (1922-1938)
Torsten Rothberg (1938-1938)
Walter Johansson (acting 1938)
Ruben Österberg (1938-1945)
Herman Koroleff (1945-1954)
Tor Brenning (1954-1972)
Martin Isaksson (1972-1982)
Henrik Gustafsson (1982-1999)
Peter Lindbäck (1999-2009)

See also
Government of Åland
Provincial Governors of Finland

Politics of Åland
Political history of Finland